Lowell Fillmore "Sly" Dunbar (born 10 May 1952, Kingston, Jamaica) is a drummer, best known as one half of the prolific Jamaican rhythm section and reggae production duo Sly and Robbie.

Biography
Dunbar began playing at 15 in a band called The Yardbrooms. His first appearance on a recording was on the Dave and Ansell Collins album Double Barrel. Dunbar joined a band Ansell Collins called Skin, Flesh and Bones.

Speaking on his influences, Sly explains “My mentor was the drummer for the Skatalites, Lloyd Knibb. And I used to listen a lot to the drummer for Booker T. & the M.G.'s, Al Jackson Jr., and a lot of Philadelphia. And there are other drummers in Jamaica, like Santa and Carly from the Wailers Band, Winston Bennett, Paul Douglas, Mikey Boo. I respect all these drummers and have learnt a lot from them. From them, I listened and created my own style. They played some things I copied, other things I recreated."

In 1972, Dunbar met and became friends with Robbie Shakespeare, who was then bass guitarist for the Hippy Boys. Shakespeare recommended Dunbar to Bunny Lee as a possible session drummer for the Aggrovators. Dunbar and Shakespeare decided to continue performing together. They worked with Peter Tosh and his band until 1981, recording five albums.

Dunbar noted about the Mighty Diamonds' song "Right Time": "When that tune first come out, because of that double tap on the rim nobody believe it was me on the drums, they thought it was some sort of sound effect we was using. Then when it go to number 1 and stay there, everybody started trying for that style and it soon become established." According to The Independent, the entire album Right Time was "revolutionary", the breakthrough album of "masters of groove and propulsion" Dunbar and Shakespeare, with "Sly's radical drumming matching the singers' insurrectionary lyrics blow-for-blow."

Dunbar and Shakespeare formed their Taxi Records label in 1980. It has seen releases from many international successful artists, including Black Uhuru, Chaka Demus and Pliers, Ini Kamoze, Beenie Man and Red Dragon.

Dunbar played for the Aggrovators for Bunny Lee, the Upsetters for Lee Perry, the Revolutionaries for Joseph Hoo Kim, and recorded for Barry O'Hare in the 1990s.

Dunbar plays drums on several noteworthy tracks produced by Lee Perry including "Night Doctor", Junior Murvin's "Police and Thieves", and Bob Marley's "Punky Reggae Party" 12" track (although the track was produced by Perry, Dunbar's drum track was actually recorded at Joe Gibbs Duhaney Park studio).

Sly and Robbie also played on Bob Dylan's albums Infidels and Empire Burlesque (using recordings from the Infidels sessions). Other sessions include their appearance on three Grace Jones albums, and work with Herbie Hancock, Joe Cocker, Serge Gainsbourg and the Rolling Stones.

In 2008, Sly Dunbar collaborated with the Jamaican percussionist Larry McDonald, on his debut album Drumquestra.

Dunbar appeared in the 2011 documentary Reggae Got Soul: The Story of Toots and the Maytals which was featured on the BBC and described as “The untold story of one of the most influential artists ever to come out of Jamaica”.

In 1979, Brian Eno remarked of Sly Dunbar: " (...) So when you buy a reggae record, there's a 90 percent chance the drummer is Sly Dunbar. You get the impression that Sly Dunbar is chained to a studio seat somewhere in Jamaica, but in fact what happens is that his drum tracks are so interesting, they get used again and again."

Collaborations
With Grace Jones
 Warm Leatherette (Island Records, 1980)
 Nightclubbing (Island Records, 1981)
 Living My Life (Island Records, 1982)
 Hurricane (PIAS Recordings, 2008)

With Joan Armatrading
 Walk Under Ladders (A&M Records, 1981)

With Simply Red
 Life (East West Records, 1995)
 Blue (East West Records, 1998)

With Peter Tosh
 Equal Rights (EMI, 1977)
 Bush Doctor (EMI, 1978)
 Mystic Man (EMI, 1979)
 Wanted Dread & Alive (Capitol Records, 1981)
 Mama Africa (EMI, 1983)

With Joe Cocker
 Sheffield Steel (Island Records, 1982)

With Jimmy Cliff
 Follow My Mind (Reprise Records, 1975)
 Give the People What They Want (MCA Records, 1981)
 Special (Columbia Records, 1982)
 Cliff Hanger (CBS Records, 1985)
 Humanitarian (CBS Records, 1999)

With Ziggy Marley and the Melody Makers
 Hey World! (EMI, 1986)

With Gwen Guthrie
 Gwen Guthrie (Island Records, 1982)
 Portrait (Island Records, 1983)
 Good to Go Lover (Polydor Records, 1986)

With Gary Barlow
 Sing (Decca Records, 2012)

With Bob Dylan
 Infidels (Columbia Records, 1983)
 Empire Burlesque (Columbia Records, 1985)
 Down in the Groove (Columbia Records, 1988)

With Jenny Morris
 Honeychild (East West, 1991)

With Ian Dury
 Lord Upminster (Polydor Records, 1981)

With Carly Simon
 Hello Big Man (Warner Bros. Records, 1983)

With Mick Jagger
 She's the Boss (Columbia Records, 1985)

With Yoko Ono
 Starpeace (PolyGram Records, 1985)

With Jackson Browne
 World in Motion (Elektra Records, 1989)

With Nona Hendryx
 Nona (RCA Records, 1983)

With Garland Jeffreys
 Wildlife Dictionary (RCA Records, 1997)

With Sinéad O'Connor
 Throw Down Your Arms (Chocolate and Vanilla, 2005)

References

External links

Sly Dunbar biography @ Drummerworld.com
 
 

1952 births
Living people
Musicians from Kingston, Jamaica
Jamaican session musicians
Jamaican reggae musicians
Dub musicians
Jamaican drummers
Male drummers

fr:Sly and Robbie#Sly Dunbar